Flatiron or flat iron may refer to various things, often in the shape of a wedge:

Objects
Clothes iron
Hair iron

Places
Flatiron Building, New York City, at the intersection of 5th & Broadway  
Flatiron District, New York City, named after the Flatiron Building
List of buildings named Flatiron Building, including many other buildings
Flat Iron, Indiana, a small community in Vermillion County
Flat Iron, Virginia
Flatirons Community Church, a large non-denominational church in Lafayette, Colorado

Geology
Flatiron (geomorphology), a steeply sloping wedge shaped landscape feature
Flatirons, rock formations near Boulder, Colorado
Flatiron (volcano), a volcano in Wells Gray Park, British Columbia, Canada
The Flatiron, a headland overlooking Granite Harbour, Victoria Land, Antarctica

Other
 The Flatiron (photograph), a 1904 photograph by Edward Steichen
Flatiron Books, a division of Macmillan Publishers
Flat Iron, a First Nations lacrosse player who competed in the 1904 Summer Olympics for Canada
Flat-iron gunboat, a 19th-century iron gunboat typified by a single large gun fitted in the bow
Flatiron (ship), a type of British ship for passing under low bridges
Flat iron steak, a cut of beef
Flatiron Construction, a civil infrastructure construction firm